Harold Charles Sydney Heylen (25 May 1922 – 4 December 1996), credited variously as Syd Heylen, Sid Heylen  and Sydney Heylen,  was an Australian character actor of radio, stage, television and film, comedian, and variety performer and soldier, he often performed in a traditional vaudeville style in the vein of Roy Rene. 
 
He was best known for his role in A Country Practice, as the RSL club manager, barman and chef Vernon "Cookie" Locke, alongside Gordon Piper as his mate Bob Hatfield. Cookie and Bob were styled as a version of The Odd Couple, with Cookie as the slob and Bob as the neat one. In the series he was briefly engaged to town gossip Esme Watson (Joyce Jacobs)   
 
He went into vaudeville after World War II and in 1956 starred in the variety show "The Show of Stars" with straight man Hal Lashwood and John Ewart.  
 
Heylen became popular during the 1960s on television as a regular performer on the HSV-7 variety show Sunnyside Up for 10 years, appearing as "Sydney from Sydney". He teamed up with other comics, such as Honest John Gilbert, Maurie Fields, and Val Jellay presenting comedy sketches in between the musical items. Recycling his vaudeville shtick, Heylen specialised in stooges prone to cheekiness, drunkenness, pratfalls and spit takes.

Early life
Heylen was born in Renmark, South Australia in 1922 (his grave marker states 1923, however all official documents give this year) as the only son of a carpenter. He joined the army at 16 and served on the Kokoda Trail in the 39th Infantry Battalion, later going on to join an army entertainment troupe. In 1961, he married Patti Brittain (his second wife) and they had two children (both in the entertainment industry) - a daughter, Julie Heylen, and a son, Syd Heylen Junior, who is a well known entertainer in variety and cabaret.

Career
Heylen appeared in numerous smaller television series roles including Crawford Production staples Matlock Police, Homicide and Division 4 in each case in 5 different roles,  as well as  Alvin Purple, but remains best known for his permanent and long running role as Vernon "Cookie" Locke, a chef and barman in the Australian television series A Country Practice, a role he played from 1982 until 1992. He was cast as Cookie on A Country Practice after the series creator and executive producer James Davern saw him in the ill-fated TV series Arcade in 1980 alongside Lorrae Desmond, whom he would also cast in ACP. Heylen was written out of the series in 1992 alongside another older cast member Gordon Piper (who played Cookie's mate Bob Hatfield) as the producers wanted to concentrate on a younger cast and an updated formula. Davern would later regret dropping Cookie and Bob, as they were two of the show's central  older characters who provided many of the comedy scenes between the more dramatic storylines.

Previously Heylen had acted in the soap opera The Box playing a fast-talking television sportscaster.

Heylen played a minor role in the film Mad Max 2: The Road Warrior as Curmudgeon.

In the 1980s, he released a number of albums on vinyl: a spoken word album with comedian/entertainer Maurie Fields and a collaboration with ACP co-star Lorrae Desmond and  music albums including "Cookie" featuring jazz, world music, folk, country and stage and screen tunes and containing songs such as covers like Patsy Cline's "Who's Sorry Now?", to which the D-Generation quipped "anyone who bought the album".

Later life and death
After he left A Country Practice in 1992, he and his wife Patti retired to their Gold Coast, Queensland home. Occasionally he would do public appearances and performances. He died from a stroke on 4 December 1996.

Recognition
Heylen was a patron and performer for the Variety Club Australia, where he was awarded as The First National Treasure.

Filmography

References

External links
 
 

1922 births
1996 deaths
Australian male film actors
Australian male television actors
People from Renmark, South Australia
20th-century Australian male actors